Nicolò Corradini (born October 20, 1964) is an Italian ski-orienteering competitor and world champion.

Corradini is an athlete of the G.S. Fiamme Oro.

Biography
He received a gold medal in the long course at the 1994, 1996 World Ski Orienteering Championships, in the short (now middle) distance he shared the first place in 1994 with Ivan Kuzmin and won short distance in 2000, also he received a bronze medal in 1998 in the long.

References

1964 births
Living people
Italian orienteers
Male orienteers
Ski-orienteers
Orienteers of Fiamme Oro